Calstock is a civil parish and a large village in south east Cornwall, England, United Kingdom, on the border with Devon.

The parish had a population of 6,095 in the 2001 census. This had increased to 6,431 at the 2011 census.

As well as Calstock, other settlements in the parish include Albaston, Chilsworthy, Gunnislake, Harrowbarrow, Latchley, Metherell, Coxpark, Dimson, Drakewalls, Norris Green, Rising Sun and St Ann's Chapel.

Calstock village is within the Tamar Valley AONB, is overlooked by Cotehele house and gardens, and lies on the scenic Tamar Valley railway. Calstock railway station opened on 2 March 1908. The village is twinned with Saint-Thuriau in Brittany, France.

Early history

There is evidence of human settlement in Calstock from Roman, or pre-Roman times, settlers attracted by the rich source of minerals, such as tin, in the area. An Iron Age hill fort is to be found in the north of the parish. A Roman fort, only the third known in Cornwall, was discovered next to the church in 2008. It is thought that up to 500 soldiers would have been based here. More recent excavations have revealed the presence of a Roman mine consisting of pits connected by a network of tunnels. There is also evidence of a Roman road in the vicinity.

In Saxon times Calstock was in the Kingdom of Cornwall, which resisted the spread of Wessex from the east. In 838 CE Wessex had spread as far as the Tamar, and a battle for independence was fought near Calstock. Following the Norman Conquest, Calstock manor was recorded in the Domesday Book, referred to as Callestock. The Saxon manor (held by Asgar) was taken over, and in the 14th century became part of the Duchy of Cornwall: one of the 17 Antiqua maneria. At the time of Domesday Book (1086) the manor was held by Reginald from Robert, Count of Mortain. There were two and a half hides of land and land for 12 ploughs. Reginald held one virgate of land with 2 ploughs and 12 serfs. 30 villeins and 30 smallholders had the rest of the land with 6 ploughs. There were 100 acres of woodland, 3 square leagues of pasture and 3 pigs. The value of the manor was £3 sterling though it had formerly been worth £6. The manor was sold by the Duchy to John Williams of Scorrier House circa 1807.

During the English Civil War Calstock became a garrison of the Royalists in Cornwall, consisting of roughly 1,200 Cornishmen. The force was quartered at Cotehele and Harewood House. During the civil war, the Parliamentarians attacked Gunnislake New Bridge, it was defended by Sir Richard Grenville and Captain Southcote with men from their garrison at Calstock. At the cost of 240 men the bridge was lost to the Parliamentarian forces, however they failed to advance further into Cornwall. Calstock and Cornwall were commended by King Charles I for their loyalty and the King's letter to the Cornish people is still displayed at St Andrew's Church, Calstock.

Industries

Mining

Mining was important in Calstock from Mediaeval times, with the Duchy mining silver. The industry was booming in the late 19th century, and the discovery of copper, coupled with nearby granite quarrying, made Calstock a busy port. The rapid population boom due to the growth of industry led, in 1849, to an outbreak of cholera. The industry declined in the early 20th century due to foreign competition, and now only the ruined pump houses that dot the landscape remain.

Calstock had much mining activity, principally;
Cotehele Consol - copper and arsenic
Calstock Consol - copper
Okeltor Consol - copper, tin and arsenic, mined silver and copper up until 1877
Wheal Trelawny - copper, very close to Okeltor Consols
Danescombe Mines - copper, tin and arsenic
Wheal Zion - copper
Wheal Edward - copper and arsenic
Wheal Arthur - copper and arsenic, directly east of Wheal Edward

Transport

Calstock Quay and Danescombe Quay were once important for transporting minerals from the various mines in the area. In the Victorian era when steamers brought tourists to the village, Calstock was visited by Queen Victoria and Prince Albert in 1846. Tourist boats still operate from Plymouth as far as Cotehele in the summer months. The importance of the river as a transport route declined with the construction of the  Tamar Valley railway at the start of the 20th century. The village is still dominated by the railway's viaduct.

Boat building
The river has its own unique design of craft, The Tamar barge. Calstock had two main boat builders, Goss's Yard, which built the West Country Ketch Garlandstone, now at Morwellham Quay industrial museum, and May's Yard, in the Danescombe Valley. Garlandstone was, unusually, built as a speculative venture by James Goss to keep his men employed at a period of diminishing repair work following the run down and closure of Morwellham Quay. A surviving Tamar barge, Shamrock, is preserved by the National Trust and National Maritime Museum at Cotehele Quay. A second barge, Lynher, also built by James Goss, is privately owned at Cremyll

Lime production

There are four sets of lime kilns at Calstock and more at Cotehele Quay. Further kilns were located at various points along the river. The burning of lime was a major industry in the area in the 19th century. The limestone was delivered to the kilns by boat but the resulting lime was shipped out to the various farms by horse and cart. It was used as a fertiliser, an ingredient in paint and as a mortar for bricklaying.

Churches

Parish church of St Andrew

The church is said to have been consecrated about 1290. Nothing obvious remains of this period, but the pillars and arches to the north of the centre aisle of the present building are early 14th century. About 1420 the south aisle was added, and the whole church re-roofed. In 1861 an architectural survey of the diocese of Exeter noted that the whole church was in a sad state. This resulted in the thorough restoration of 1867, the floor levels were altered, the existing tiles relaid, the chancel given its present roof, and the building furnished with plain pitched-pine benches. Although the restoration was severe, many of the interesting features of the church were preserved. In addition, three chapels-of-ease were built at Gunnislake, Harrowbarrow and Latchley; these chapels were needed because of the increase in population for the mines of the parish.

St. Anne's, Gunnislake
The land was bought on 29 January 1879. The total cost of the building was £2,400 of which the Duke of Bedford gave £500 and the Church building society gave £200. 
The foundation stone of the church was laid by the Dowager Countess of Mount Edgcumbe, at 3pm on Tuesday, 30 September 1879. The building was designed by J. Piers St Aubyn and was consecrated by Edward Benson, the Bishop of Truro, in 1880.  It was dedicated to St. Anne because of an ancient local holy well, close to the site of the church. The church seats up to 225 worshippers. In 1918 Gunnislake made an appeal to become its own separate parish but failed to raise the necessary funds.

All Saints, Harrowbarrow
In 1870 a parishioner presented the rector with a piece of land, near the Prince of Wales Mine, and then the church was again designed by J. Piers St Aubyn and was built as a school and a mission chapel for £700. The church seats up to 80 worshippers.

Albaston Chapel
The graveyard in front was consecrated in 1888. Outside the chapel, just inside the main gate, there is a large granite memorial cross commemorating 132 men who made the supreme sacrifice in war. The cross bears the following inscription;

St Michael and All Angels, Latchley Church
In 1879 the "foundation stone of our long wished for church was laid". Latchley church was designed by Piers St Aubyn, the same architect as Gunnislake. It was built three years later than Gunnislake at a cost of £1,147 as a chapel-of-ease dedicated to St Michael and All Angels. It was dedicated by the Bishop of Truro on 20 July 1883. After a bad attack of woodworm to the building in August 1968 it was closed to worshippers and in 1985 it was sold and used for a dwelling.

Cotehele's Chapels

St. Katharine, House Chapel Cotehele
In Cotehele, on the west side of Hall Court is the vicarage and chapel. The chapel, dedicated to St. Katharine and St. Anne, is connected to the main building via a small passageway leading to the dining room. The chapel is one of the oldest rooms in the house, alongside the Great Hall. It still has the original clock, a rare example from the Tudor period, still in operation today.

St. Thomas Becket, Woodland Chapel Cotehele
In the grounds of Cotehele, directly East of the House close to the River Tamar, lies a peaceful basic chapel. inside there are pews going around the walls, two minister's benches and a very ornate table. the patron saint of the chapel is St. Thomas Becket.

Primary school
Calstock Community Primary School was built in 1901 and opened on 6 January 1902. At that time the school consisted of just two main classrooms. It has since been extended with the addition of the infant suite which won an award for architectural design, in keeping with the remainder of the school. The centenary of the school was celebrated in the summer of 2002. In 2014 Stoke Climsland School federated with Calstock to pool resources. The vast majority of pupils continue their education at Callington Community College or Devonport High School for Boys / Girls.

Railway

East Cornwall Mineral Railway

The East Cornwall Mineral Railway was a  gauge railway line, opened in 1872 to connect mines and quarries in the Callington and Gunnislake areas in east Cornwall with shipping at Calstock on the River Tamar. The line included a rope-worked incline to descend to the quay at Calstock. Wagons with goods from the mines around Gunnislake and Callington were brought down the hillside on a  cable-worked incline with a gradient of 1 in 6 (17%).

Following the opening of the LSWR mainline railway at nearby Bere Alston, a connecting line from there to Calstock was opened, and the existing line converted to standard gauge, opening throughout as a passenger line in 1908. When rural lines in the area were closed in the 1960s under the Beeching Axe, a short section of the original ECMR line was retained to keep open a connection from Plymouth to Gunnislake, and that section remains open.

Calstock Viaduct

It was built between 1904 and 1907 by John Lang of Liskeard using 11,148 concrete blocks.  These were cast in a temporary yard on the Devon bank opposite the village.  The engineers were Richard Church and W. R. Galbraith. The viaduct was first crossed by truck on 8 August 1907 and first used by passengers on 2 March 1908.

It is a Grade II* listed structure.

Services

Literary associations
The poetry publisher Peterloo Poets, founded by Harry Chambers, was based in Calstock until it closed down in 2009. Peterloo Poets was formerly based at Liskeard. In 2010 Chambers was honoured for services to Poetry in the New Year Honours.

Local establishments

During Victorian times the parish had "13 churches and 13 taverns." Now the parish only has four churches and nine taverns, including the Tamar Inn, on Calstock Quay, which dates from the 17th century and was rumoured to be the haunt of smugglers and highwaymen, and the Boot Inn, in the centre of the village, built in the year 1666.

Calstock has a non-league football club, playing in the second division of the Duchy League. Their home ground is on Calstock Quay by the banks of the River Tamar. The club’s nickname, The Bees, and logo are derived from Cornwall‘s county colours of black and gold. The club is run by local volunteers and is sponsored by the Tamar Inn, also located on Calstock Quay.

Governance
In 1894 the parish was made its own rural district, Calstock Rural District, at the time Calstock had a large population. In 1934 the rural district was abolished and amalgamated with Callington Urban District to form St Germans Rural District. Then in 1974 the St Germans Rural District was amalgamated with Liskeard Rural District to form Caradon. In 2009 Caradon was abolished so that the whole of Cornwall was governed by one unitary authority, Cornwall Council.

Parish Council
Calstock Parish Council forms the lowest tier of local government. The parish council was established in 1934, after Calstock Rural District was amalgamated the parish with the Rural District of St Germans. 
 
Eighteen councillors are elected or co-opted from the five wards of the parish - Calstock, Chilsworthy, Delaware, Gunnislake and Harrowbarrow. The council meets at the Tamar Valley Centre in Drakewalls.

Cornwall Council election, 2017
The 2017 Cornwall Council election was held on 4 May 2017 as part of the 2017 local elections in the United Kingdom 122 councilors were elected from the 121 electoral divisions of Cornwall Council.

Local heraldry
For further reading consult; Cornish heraldry

Twin towns
   Saint-Thuriau, Brittany

Places of interest

See also

 Calstock railway station
 East Cornwall Mineral Railway
 Tamar Valley Line
 Harewood House and Estate
 River Tamar

References

External links

 Calstock Online Parish Clerk
 Calstock History
 Cornwall Record Office Online Catalogue for Calstock
Calstock Parish Church History, Rev Gordon Ruming

Calstock
Civil parishes in Cornwall
Manors in Cornwall
Ports and harbours of Cornwall
River Tamar
Villages in Cornwall